The 2012 Donington Superbike World Championship round was the fifth round of the 2012 Superbike World Championship season and of the 2012 Supersport World Championship season. It took place on the weekend of 11–13 May 2012 at Donington Park in North West Leicestershire, England.

Superbike

Race 1 classification

Race 2 classification

Supersport

Race classification

External links
 The official website of the Superbike World Championship

Donington
Donington
Donington Superbike World Championship round